Hugh John Frederick Lawson, 6th Baron Burnham (15 August 1931 – 1 January 2005), was a British peer and journalist.

The second son of the 4th Baron Burnham, he was educated at Eton College and read PPE at Balliol College, Oxford. Initially working for the Cambridge Evening News, he joined The Daily Telegraph prior to its 1986 takeover by Conrad Black, and held the positions of general manager and deputy managing director in the 1970s and 80s. Upon inheriting his brother's title in 1993, he had a career in the House of Lords as a Conservative defence spokesman and junior whip. He was one of the 90 hereditary peers who were selected to remain in the House of Lords after the passing of the House of Lords Act 1999.

In 1955, Lord Burnham married Hilary Hunter with whom he had three children – two daughters and a son, Harry, who inherited the title.

Arms

References 

20th-century British newspaper publishers (people)
People educated at Eton College
Alumni of Balliol College, Oxford
Hugh
Younger sons of barons
1931 births
2005 deaths

Hereditary peers elected under the House of Lords Act 1999